Formosa is a hard rock band from Germany, formed in 2015.

History

Foundation 
The bandmembers Nik Bird (vocals, bass), Nik Beer (electric guitar) and Paris Jay (drums) have known each other since they were in kindergarten and grew up in the direct neighborhood in Wahlwies next to the Lake Constance. They have been performing and writing songs together since they were teenagers. At the end of 2014 they moved together to the Ruhr area to start Formosa as a power trio in 2015.

Tight & Sexy (2015–2016) 
In 2015, the band members began working on their first album and released Tight & Sexy on 13 May 2016 through the record label Sweepland Records. A Germany-wide album tour and numerous other concerts in well-known scene clubs followed.

Sorry for Being Sexy (2017–2018) 
Already in the summer of 2017 Formosa began recording their second studio album Sorry for Being Sexy.  They played as an opening band for Battle Beast and Ignite, and in the fall they went on their first international headlining tour through the Balkans. March 2018, the album Sorry for Being Sexy was released via Sweepland Records. This was followed by an extensive European tour through a total of 13 countries with over 70 concerts. Sorry for Being Sexy landed at No. 9 on the official German metal rock charts. Formosa played over 140 concert across Europe in 2017–2018 sharing the stage with bands such as Thundermother, The New Roses and Bonfire.

On 6 January 2017, singer Nik Bird dislocated his arm in a stage accident. He nevertheless played the concert to the end and then got into the already waiting ambulance. Andy Brings, who was present at the concert, commented on the accident and Nik Bird's fearless continuation of playing as "a great hour for rock 'n' roll".

Danger Zone (2019–2021) 
In early 2019, Formosa recorded their third album Danger Zone in Antwerp. As producers, the band hired Martin Furia (eg. Destruction and Nervosa). After the recording sessions Formosa went on a support tour with Nazareth. In the summer of 2019 various well-known music festivals followed including a performance during the Reeperbahn Festival in Hamburg, Germany.

In 2019, Formosa parted ways with their music label Sweepland Records and signed a label deal with Metalville. On 13 March 2020, Formosa released their third album Danger Zone – simultaneously, however, on the same day, the ongoing tour with Audrey Horne was canceled due to the COVID-19 pandemic.

Bones EP (2022) 
In 2022 Formosa released several singles, which together appeared on the Bones EP. On the song Her Mama, guitarist Ande Braun from Kissin' Dynamite plays the guitar solo and can also be seen in the accompanying video. The acoustic version of the song Dynamite features a hammered dulcimer played by drummer Paris Jay.

For June 11, 2022, Formosa has planned the Formosa Beer Festival'22. At this festival, Formosa will pour the beer created especially for this event. The recipe for the Formosa beer comes from guitarist Nik Beer, who is a qualified brewmaster.

Musical style and influence 

Formosa are playing riff based melodic hard rock.

In addition to classic hard rock, Formosa's music also contains influences from heavy metal and southern rock. Notable band influences include Kiss, Judas Priest and AC/DC. Sometimes Formosa are compared with Whitesnake.

The band's lyrics are in English and are often characterized by striking phrases in the chorus. Examples here are songs like Fuck up your Liver and Sold my Soul. Often, the voice of Nik Bird is compared to the voice of the young Geddy Lee (Rush) or Vince Neil (Mötley Crüe).

The influences from southern rock, especially Lynyrd Skynyrd and ZZ Top are evident in the solo of Leader of the Pack and with Manic Lover Formosa have a power ballad in their repertoire.

Typical movements are the "Judas Priest moves" of Nik Bird and Nik Beer and the intense headbanging of drummer Paris Jay.

Discography

Albums 

 2016: Tight & Sexy  (Sweepland Records) 
 2018: Sorry for Being Sexy (Sweepland Records)
 2020: Danger Zone (Metalville)

Singles 

 2016: Friends of the Night
 2017: Love on the Highway
 2018: Fuck Up Your Liver
 2018: Mañana
 2018: Mañana – Acoustic
 2018: Johnny the Beaver – Acoustic
 2020: Sold My Soul
 2020: Dynamite
 2022: Dynamite (Acoustic Version)
 2022: Let it go / Saturday Night
 2022: Her Mama feat. Ande Braun of Kissin’ Dynamite and Thorsten Rock of The Legendary

External links 
 Official Website
 Formosa's channel on YouTube
 Formosa on Discogs

References 

German rock music groups
German hard rock musical groups
German heavy metal musical groups
English-language singers from Germany